Akkarvik is a small village along the Langfjorden in Skjervøy Municipality, in the northern part of Troms og Finnmark county, Norway. It has been populated since the 17th century. At its peak during the 1950s, about 400 people lived there. There was a shop, post office, and a bakery. By the year 2001, however, the population has dwindled down to 24 people in 14 private homes. In 2021 the population are down to 10.

References

External links
http://www.akkarvik.no 

Villages in Troms
Skjervøy